Starokalmashevo (İśke Qalmaş) is a rural locality (a selo) and the administrative centre of Starokalmashevsky Selsoviet, Chekmagushevsky District, Bashkortostan, Russia. The population was 1,849 as of 2010. There are 19 streets.

Geography 
Starokalmashevo is located 15 km east of Chekmagush (the district's administrative centre) by road. Bulgar is the nearest rural locality.

References 

Rural localities in Chekmagushevsky District